Here is a 2011 American drama adventure film directed by Braden King who also co-wrote the movie with Dani Valent. The film stars Ben Foster and Lubna Azabal.

Synopsis
Will Shepard (Foster), a solitary young man who lives in the San Francisco bay area, travels to Armenia to undertake a mapping survey in the rural areas of the country to confirm ground features and coordinates with GPS satellite data. There he meets Gadarine Nazarian (Azabal), a spirited Armenian ex-pat and professional photographer, who has returned home to face family issues. She decides to accompany Will on his journey, acting as his interpreter, while taking photographs too. They fall in love as they wander the countryside. Their affair lasts several days, but he has to move on.

Production
The film was shot on location in Armenia. After filming of the movie ended, five members of the cast and crew, including Ben Foster, got tattooed with the letters T.I.A., which stand for This Is Armenia.

Reception
Here garnered mostly positive reviews and currently holds a 71% positive rating on Rotten Tomatoes based on 13 reviews. Stephen Holden of The New York Times said of the film, "Here, filmed by Lol Crowley, is still a stunner. Flawed as it is, I admire it immensely."

Awards and nominations
2011 Berlin Film Festival
Special Jury Prize (Won)
2012 Independent Spirit Awards
Best Cinematography: Lol Crowley (Nominated)

References

External links
 
 
 

2011 films
American adventure drama films
2010s adventure drama films
2011 drama films
2010s English-language films
2010s American films